Empress Walk is a large Canadian condominium and retail complex in  Toronto, Ontario, Canada. It is located at the intersection of Yonge Street and Empress Avenue in the North York Centre area of the North York district It was developed by Canadian-developers Menkes Developments Ltd. Phase 1 was completed in 1997 and Phase 2 was completed in 2000. It became an important retail complex in North York following its construction.

The podium of the complex is a three-storey retail mall. It covers  topped with a  dome, that highlights the longest unsupported escalator in North America to give access to the movie theatre from the ground floor. There is a 3,035-seat Cineplex Cinemas movie multiplex featuring a state of the art IMAX Theatre. The lowest level has underground access to the North York Centre subway station.

Above the retail complex are two 34-storey residential towers, known as the Pinnacle and Royal Pinnacle, with a total of 745 units between them. Major retail anchors inside Empress Walk include Loblaws, LCBO, Shoppers Drug Mart, Cineplex Cinemas, PetSmart, and Dollarama.

History 
Since the 1970s, local politician Mel Lastman wanted to turn central North York into a second downtown for Toronto. Until 1998, a separate city from Toronto with the regional government of Metropolitan Toronto. Lastman began a wave of development proposals that eventually led to a large number of high-rise and government buildings being constructed along Yonge Street, leading to the creation of North York Centre within the larger existing neighbourhood of Willowdale.

Menkes Developments Ltd. constructed many of the condominium complexes in North York Centre including, Gibson Square, Ultima, Broadway.  It initially proposed the development in the early 1990s, Toronto Centre for the Arts and other developments were already underway in North York at the time. In the mid-1990s, Menkes put forward a proposal for a mall and residential complex in the center of North York Centre. This move coincided with the 1998 Toronto amalgamation where the surrounding cities and one borough became part of the City of Toronto. While controversial, many districts such as North York prospered in the years following the move.

Empress Walk was built as part of Mel Lastman's bid to create a downtown in North York to rival Toronto's. Empress Walk remains a hub of activity, while also spurring on new condominium projects being built north and south of it today. Its residential building, which was completed at the same time as the retail complex, was for decades one of the tallest buildings in North York until being surpassed by newer developments such as the Hullmark Centre.

Empress Walk and other major developments in the nearby area meant North York Centre became a second central business district for the City of Toronto from the 1990s onwards. The plans for Empress Walk meant that the North York Centre station could be integrated with the new mall, giving residents of the towers access to the Toronto subway system.

Nearby 

Behind the Empress Walk complex on its east side is Princess Park, commemorating the original sites of the first municipal building and fire hall of North York. It features the façade of the former Township of North York Municipal Offices from the 1940s, while the bell/clock tower from the fire hall has been reconstructed and serves as the centrepiece for the park.

Across the street, and connected via the TTC tunnel, are Mel Lastman Square, the North York Civic Centre, the North York City Centre office tower and Novotel. Next door, and connected via a passageway is the 5075 Yonge Street tower, with Scotiabank and Upper Madison College.

In 2000, the property was acquired by RioCan REIT, a Canadian real estate investment trust.

Tenants

Anchor tenants  

 Cineplex Cinemas (originally Famous Players SilverCity & Empire Theatres) (Cineplex had merged with Famous Players in the 1990s and sold its Empress Walk location as it had a nearby Cineplex Sheppard Grande theatre at Sheppard Avenue and Yonge Street. In 2013, when Empire Theatres exited the Ontario market, Cineplex reacquired and renovated the Empress Walk location, while the Cineplex Sheppard Grande was demolished in 2016 as part of a major redevelopment Yonge Sheppard Centre. 
 LCBO (formerly part of Indigo Books and Music then converted into a multi level retail space, now a one level LCBO)
 Loblaws Empress Market (this is the first time Loblaws operated an underground store)

List of current tenants 
 Shinhan Bank
 Wendy's 
 Dollarama (formerly Fabricland and originally Tower Records)
 PetSmart (formerly Solutions, Staples, prior to that; Indigo Books and Music originally)
 F45 Training 
 The Second Cup
 RBC Meeting Place (formerly Milestones Grill and Bar) 
 Shinta BBQ (formerly Indigo Books and Music)
 Petit Potato (formerly Milestones Grill and Bar)
 Real Fruit Bubble Tea 
 Shoppers Drug Mart (formerly Best Buy Canada re-branded from Future Shop, prior to that Sport Chek). Shoppers Drug Mart had a smaller store south of Empress Walk at the base of the Ultima Condominiums which was part of the Broadway by Menkes project in 2004-2005
 The second floor also includes a dance studio and many health clinics.

References

Buildings and structures in Toronto
Residential condominiums in Canada
Residential buildings completed in 1997
Residential buildings completed in 2000
Cineplex Entertainment
Shopping malls in Toronto
North York
Toronto Transit Commission
1997 establishments in Ontario